Ingeborg Schöner is a German film and television actress.

Selected filmography
 
 The Silent Angel (1954)
 The Dark Star (1955)
 The Captain and His Hero (1955)
 The First Day of Spring (1956)
 King in Shadow (1957)
 Souvenir d'Italie (1957)
 Pirate of the Half Moon (1957)
 Venice, the Moon and You (1958)
 Adorable and a Liar (1958)
 People in the Net (1959)
The Cow and I (1959)
 Big Request Concert (1960)
 Yes, Women are Dangerous (1960)
 Season in Salzburg (1961)
 Waldrausch (1962)
 The Sweet Life of Count Bobby (1962)
 Axel Munthe, The Doctor of San Michele (1962)
Buffalo Bill, Hero of the Far West (1964)
Love and Marriage (1964)
 Kidnapped to Mystery Island (1964)
 When the Grapevines Bloom on the Danube (1965)
 Legacy of the Incas (1965)
 Letti sbagliati (1965)
 In Bed by Eight (1965)
 Legacy of the Incas (1965)
 The Adventurer of Tortuga (1965)
 Sperrbezirk (1966)
 The Long Day of Inspector Blomfield (1968)
 Mark of the Devil (1970)
 Mr. Superinvisible (1970)
 Die Supernasen (1983)
 Guten Tag, Ramon (2013)

References

External links
 

1935 births
Living people
German film actresses
People from Wiesbaden
People from Hesse-Nassau